Satinder Pal Singh, popularly known as Satinder Sartaaj, is an Indian singer, songwriter, actor and poet of Punjabi language. He gained fame with his song "Sai". Since then he has performed across the world. He made his film debut as Maharaja Duleep Singh in The Black Prince in 2017.

Early life 
Satinder Pal Singh was born in the village of Bajrawar in Hoshiarpur, Punjab. He attended school at the government elementary school in his village. While in the third standard, he began performing in local Bal Sabhas.

Education
Sartaaj obtained an honors degree in music from Government College, Hoshiarpur. He concentrated on his musical career while completing his MPhil in Sufi music singing and later a PhD in Sufi singing (Gayan) from Panjab University, Chandigarh. He also taught music at Panjab University for six years.  Sartaaj also completed a certificate course and Diploma in the Persian language.  He started writing poetry and adopted his Takhallus (Pen name), Sartaaj, while at college.

Career
Sartaaj pursued a professional music career in his 20s. Before this, he has stated he was a farmer and had no interest in pursuing a career as a performer. 

His big performance break was in 2008 when he got booked for a gig in Toronto, Ontario. The show's organizers had heard him singing on YouTube and wanted him to perform for the Punjabi-Canadian audience.

In 2011, Sartaaj won "Best International Act" at the Brit Asia TV Music Awards (BAMA).

On 2 May 2014, Sartaaj performed in the Royal Albert Hall. He won  "Best Songwriter" again at BAMA 2017 and "Music Video of the Year" at BAMA 2018 for "Udaarian".

He debuted in the American film industry with the lead role in the movie The Black Prince, a historic biopic of Maharaja Duleep Singh which was released on 21 July 2017.

Philosophy 
Although he has taught at the university and is an accomplished bhangra performer, composer and singer, Sartaaj has said that he considers shayari (poetry) as his first love.

Discography

Filmography

References 

Living people
Indian male folk singers
Punjabi-language singers
Performers of Sufi music
Indian Sufis
Indian Sikhs
Punjabi people
People from Hoshiarpur
Panjab University alumni
Year of birth missing (living people)